The Roman Catholic Diocese of Raigarh is a diocese located at the Bishop's House in Kunkuri, Raigarh. It is in the Ecclesiastical province of Raipur in India.

History
On 13 December 1951, it was established as Diocese of Raigarh–Ambikapur from the Diocese of Nagpur and Diocese of Ranchi. Later, on 10 November 1977, it was renamed as Diocese of Raigarh when the Diocese of Ambikapur was erected.

Leadership
 Bishops of Raigarh (Latin Rite)
 Bishop Paul Toppo (23 March 2006 – present)
 Bishop Victor Kindo (25 November 1985 – 23 March 2006)
 Bishop Francis Ekka (10 November 1977 – 15 March 1984)
 Bishops of Raigarh – Ambikapur (Latin Rite)
 Bishop Francis Ekka (24 April 1971 – 10 November 1977)
 Bishop Stanislaus Tigga (24 December 1957 – 9 July 1970)
 Bishop Oscar Sevrin, S.J. (13 December 1951 – 8 November 1957)

References

External links
 GCatholic.org 
 Catholic Hierarchy 

Roman Catholic dioceses in India
Christian organizations established in 1951
Roman Catholic dioceses and prelatures established in the 20th century
Christianity in Chhattisgarh
1951 establishments in India
Raigarh district